Secret Windows: Essays and Fiction on the Craft of Writing is a collection of short stories, essays, speeches, and book excerpts by Stephen King, published in 2000. It was marketed by Book-of-the-Month Club as a companion to King's On Writing. Although its title is derived from a King novella (Secret Window, Secret Garden), it is not otherwise related to that novella or the film adaptation, Secret Window.

The texts in the collection are primarily concerned with writing and the horror genre. Several of the entries have been published elsewhere, including introductions King had written for other authors' novels, as well as introductions and essays from King's previous books. This volume also includes several short works that had not been previously published elsewhere, including lectures given by King, an interview with King conducted by Muriel Gray, a never-before-published short story by King, titled "In the Deathroom," and an introduction written by Peter Straub.

Contents

2000 non-fiction books
Books about writing
English-language books

Non-fiction books by Stephen King